Harry V. Cheshire (August 16, 1891 – June 16, 1968), originally from Emporia, Kansas, was an American character actor who appeared in over 100 films, mostly playing small roles. He was also a stage actor and performed on a St. Louis radio station's musical program. He may be best known for playing Judge Ben Wiley on Buffalo Bill, Jr..

Early career
Cheshire began his show business career in 1908, entertaining the audience between reels of short silent movies at the Old Nickelodeon Theater in Kansas City. He was active in stage work with the Hi Jinks Company and Liberty Players acting troupes during the 1920s and 1930s.

He acquired the nickname Pappy after appearing as Pappy Cheshire with his Hilly Billy Band on the St. Louis radio station KMOX.

Film and television work
Cheshire’s first film role was as Pappy Cheshire in the 1940 Republic Pictures' musical Barnyard Follies. He was  the minister who marries George Bailey (James Stewart) and Mary Hatch (Donna Reed) in It’s a Wonderful Life, and played small-town judges in the westerns Sioux City Sue, The Fabulous Texan and Carbine Williams. He played Doctor Gray in Adventures of Gallant Bess. In 1955, during a two-week break from filming episodes of the television series Buffalo Bill, Jr., Cheshire was able to fit in a supporting role in the film Soldier of Fortune.

In addition to playing judges in films, Cheshire also played characters following the same occupation on two television series. From 1955 - 1956 he was Judge "Fair and Square" Ben Wiley in the syndicated western television series, Buffalo Bill, Jr.. From 1958-1962 he was Judge Trager in episodes of the Lawman.

He guest starred in other television programs, including The Lone Ranger, Annie Oakley, The Gene Autry Show, The George Burns and Gracie Allen Show, I Love Lucy and The Red Skelton Show. 

One writer stated that Cheshire had the ability "to appear genial and grumpy at the same time."

Personal life
Harry Cheshire  was married to Myrtle Cheshire. They had two children, son Harry Jr. and daughter Leona, and in February 1968 the couple celebrated their 50th wedding anniversary.

Selected filmography

 Barnyard Follies (1940) - Pappy
 Hi, Neighbor (1942) - Professor Edgar Boggs
 Swing Your Partner (1943) - Harry 'Pappy' Cheshire
 O, My Darling Clementine (1943) - 'Pappy' Cheshire
 Sing, Neighbor, Sing (1944) - Dean Cheshire
 Drifting Along (1946) - Bart Holden (uncredited)
 Smooth as Silk (1946) - Wolcott
 Traffic in Crime (1946) - Dan Marlowe
 Big Town (1946) - Police Chief Masters (uncredited)
 If I'm Lucky (1946) - Phil Gargan, State Engineer (uncredited)
 Child of Divorce (1946) - Judge
 Affairs of Geraldine (1946) - Judge Fricke
 Sioux City Sue (1946) - Mayor Tussie of Whispering Rock (uncredited)
 The Best Years of Our Lives (1946) - Minister at Wedding (uncredited)
 Dick Tracy vs. Cueball (1946) - Jules Sparkle (uncredited)
 It's a Wonderful Life (1946) - Dr. Campbell (uncredited)
 The Luckiest Guy in the World (1947, Short) - Mr. Mossley
 The Pilgrim Lady (1947) - Dr. Bekins
 Code of the West (1947) - Judge Culver (uncredited)
 Shoot to Kill (1947) - Mike Blake
 Lost Honeymoon (1947) - Judge Henderson (uncredited)
 Danger Street (1947) - Commissioner (uncredited)
 The Homestretch (1947) - Col. Albright (uncredited)
 Sport of Kings (1947) - Theodore McKeogh
 Springtime in the Sierras (1947) - Cap Foster
 The Hucksters (1947) - Joe Lorrison - Lawyer (uncredited)
 I Wonder Who's Kissing Her Now (1947) - Stage Manager (uncredited)
 Mother Wore Tights (1947) - Minister (uncredited)
 Nightmare Alley (1947) - Mr. Prescott (uncredited)
 The Invisible Wall (1947) - Eugene Hamilton
 The Fabulous Texan (1947) - Judge Gavin (uncredited)
 Her Husband's Affairs (1947) - Mayor Jim Dandy Harker (uncredited)
 The Flame (1947) - The Minister
 The Tender Years (1948) - Sheriff Fred Ackley
 Slippy McGee (1948) - Dr. Moore
 Here Comes Trouble (1948) - Judge J.J. Bellinger (uncredited)
 Mr. Reckless (1948) - Doctor at Wedding (uncredited)
 Ruthless (1948) - Lawyer Nevin (uncredited)
 Sixteen Fathoms Deep (1948) - Uncle Mike
 The Babe Ruth Story (1948) - Cap Huston (uncredited)
 Northwest Stampede (1948) - Rodeo Judge (uncredited)
 Night Wind (1948) - Judge Thorgeson (uncredited)
 For the Love of Mary (1948) - Col. Hedley
 Moonrise (1948) - J.B. Sykes
 Incident (1948) - T.A. Hartley
 Racing Luck (1948) - Radcliffe Malone
 Smoky Mountain Melody (1948) - Doc Moffitt
 Adventures of Gallant Bess (1948) - Dr. Gray
 The Lucky Stiff (1949) - Prison Warden (uncredited)
 The Clay Pigeon (1949) - Doctor (uncredited)
 Riders of the Whistling Pines (1949) - Dr. Daniel Chadwick
 Impact (1949) - Irene's Attorney
 Ma and Pa Kettle (1949) - Fletcher (uncredited)
 It Happens Every Spring (1949) - Team Doctor X-Raying King's Hand (uncredited)
 Air Hostess (1949) - Dr. Lee
 Anna Lucasta (1949) - Minister (uncredited)
 Sand (1949) - Logan (uncredited)
 Brimstone (1949) - Calvin Willis
 Miss Grant Takes Richmond (1949) - Leo Hopkins (uncredited)
 The Woman on Pier 13 (1949) - J. Francis Cornwall
 Fighting Man of the Plains (1949) - Lanyard
 Chicago Deadline (1949) - Minister (uncredited)
 Bride for Sale (1949) - Haskins (uncredited)
 The Lady Takes a Sailor (1949) - Judge Vardon (uncredited)
 Paid in Full (1950) - Minister (uncredited)
 Girls' School (1950) - Calhoun Robie
 A Woman of Distinction (1950) - Train Steward (uncredited)
 Square Dance Katy (1950) - Kimbrough
 The Arizona Cowboy (1950) - David Carson
 No Sad Songs for Me (1950) - Mel Fenelly (uncredited)
 Lucky Losers (1950) - John W. 'Chick' Martin
 County Fair (1950) - Auctioneer
 September Affair (1950) - Jim (uncredited)
 Lonely Heart Bandits (1950) - Sheriff Polk
 Chain Gang (1950) - Henry 'Pop' O'Donnell
 Let's Dance (1950) - Man (uncredited)
 Again... Pioneers (1950) - Col onelGarnett
 The Flying Missile (1950) - First Senator (uncredited)
 The Company She Keeps (1951) - Cliff Martin - Larry's Boss (uncredited)
 Blue Blood (1951) - McArthur
 Thunder in God's Country (1951) - Mayor Larkin
 As Young as You Feel (1951) - Chamber of Commerce President (uncredited)
 Rhubarb (1951) - Mr. Seegle - Board Member (uncredited)
 Bannerline (1951) - Mayor Ducat (uncredited)
 The Family Secret (1951) - Dr. Black - Coroner (uncredited)
 Here Come the Nelsons (1952) - Bronco Riding Event Announcer (uncredited)
 Phone Call from a Stranger (1952) - Dr. Luther Fletcher (uncredited)
 Just This Once (1952) - Prouty - Creditor (uncredited)
 Flesh and Fury (1952) - Dr. Gundling (uncredited)
 Carbine Williams (1952) - Judge Kerr (uncredited)
 The Sniper (1952) - Mayor (uncredited)
 Paula (1952) - Gentleman in Park (uncredited)
 Washington Story (1952) - Minor Role (uncredited)
 Ma and Pa Kettle at the Fair (1952) - Pastor (uncredited)
 Woman of the North Country (1952) - Bystander (uncredited)
 Dreamboat (1952) - Macintosh (uncredited)
 Ride the Man Down (1952) - Rancher (uncredited)
 Cry of the Hunted (1953) - Doctor (uncredited)
 Latin Lovers (1953) - Tom Marston - Board Member (uncredited)
 Devil's Canyon (1953) - Happy - the Bartender (uncredited)
 Jack Slade (1953) - Mr. Hill (uncredited)
 Escape from Fort Bravo (1953) - Chaplain (uncredited)
 Pride of the Blue Grass (1954) - Hunter
 Dangerous Mission (1954) - Mr. Elster
 Fireman Save My Child (1954) - Commissioner Spencer
 Phffft (1954) - Nina's Divorce Lawyer (uncredited)
 The Seven Little Foys (1955) - Stage Doorman at 'Iroquois' (uncredited)
 The First Traveling Saleslady (1956) - Judge Benson
 The Boss (1956) - Gov. Beck (uncredited)
 The Restless Breed (1957) - Mayor Johnson
 Loving You (1957) - Mayor (uncredited)
 My Man Godfrey (1957) - James Elliott
 I Married a Woman (1958) - Texan at Phone Booth (uncredited)
 The Big Country (1958) - Party Guest (uncredited)
 Don't Give Up the Ship (1959) - Judge Whipple - Wedding Guest with Cake in Hat (uncredited)
 Heller in Pink Tights (1960) - Poker Player (uncredited)
 From the Terrace (1960) - Partner (uncredited)
 Let's Make Love (1960) - Amanda's Father (uncredited)
 The Errand Boy (1961) - Ulysses Paramutual (uncredited)
 The Patsy (1964) - Police Sergeant (uncredited) (final film role)

References

External links

 
 

1891 births
1968 deaths
American male film actors
American male television actors
People from Emporia, Kansas
Male actors from Kansas
People from Greater Los Angeles
20th-century American male actors